Greenfield is a neighbourhood in the east end of the Scottish city of Glasgow, north of the River Clyde. The estate was built on the grounds of Greenfield House which was demolished to make way for the new scheme which was built in the 1960s.

The area is also home to a recently upgraded football centre, used for amateur games, and a public park.

Greenfield lies south of Cranhill, north of Shettleston, east of Carntyne and west of Springboig and Budhill. Housing in the area is in the form of terraced housing, tenements and maisonettes. There are also some prefab houses surviving from the 1940s.

Greenfield was one of the areas affected by the 2002 Glasgow floods. It has three schools.

References

Areas of Glasgow
Housing estates in Glasgow